La mujer de Judas (Legendary Love) is a Mexican telenovela produced by Maricarmen Marcos for Azteca.  It is based on Venezuelan novela of the same name. It stars Anette Michel, Victor Gonzalez, and Andrea Marti. It replaced Cielo Rojo on 13 January 2012. Adapted by Paz Aguirre and Gabriel Santos, this adaptation is supervised by the original writer, Martin Hahn.

Synopsis

A young lady was unjustly accused of a clergyman's murder.  With that horrible crime, she was arrested and spent 23 years in prison.  In the present day, a young lady has to figure out the real story behind the Priest's mysterious death.  Suddenly, weird events start happening.  A series of grisly and horrible murders is washed over the Del Toro residence.  These murders are committed by an enigmatic figure whose face is hooded in a smeared wedding veil.  Will Natalia find out who is the culprit and identify the real "La Mujer de Judas"?

Cast

Main cast

Secondary cast

Casting
Anette Michel was the first to cast in La Mujer de Judas. Mauricio Ochmann, Manolo Cardona, Daniel Elbittar and Victor Gonzalez auditioned for the roles of Salomon and Alirio. Carla Hernández auditioned for two roles, Emma and Natalia, but eventually failed in both characters.  Curiously, Hernandez and Ochmann became the protagonist of Telemundo's Rosa Diamante. Christian Meier auditioned for the role of Marcos, but was replaced by Javier Gomez. Later, the producers cast him for the role of Simon, however the role landed on Mauricio Islas. Peruvian actress Saby Kamalich was originally cast as Berenice, where she was seen in the promos, but on the first day of filming, she was absent and eventually rejected the role due to health problem. Marta Verduzco was selected and it marks her return to telenovelas, after being absent nearly a decade in the industry.

References

External links

 

2012 telenovelas
2012 Mexican television series debuts
2012 Mexican television series endings
Horror fiction television series
TV Azteca telenovelas
Serial killers in television
Murder in television
Mexican telenovelas
Mexican television series based on Venezuelan television series
Spanish-language telenovelas